Storm Elvin Thorgerson (28 February 1944 – 18 April 2013) was an English graphic designer and music video director. He is best known for closely working with the group Pink Floyd through most of their career, and also created album or other art for Led Zeppelin, Phish, Black Sabbath, Scorpions, UFO, Peter Gabriel, the Alan Parsons Project, Genesis, Yes, Kansas, Dream Theater, Muse, Audioslave, the Mars Volta, The Cranberries, Helloween,  Ween, Shpongle and Catherine Wheel.

Early life
Thorgerson, who was of Norwegian descent, was born in Potters Bar, Middlesex (now part of Hertfordshire). He attended Summerhill School, Brunswick Primary School in Cambridge, and the Cambridgeshire High School for Boys with Pink Floyd founders Syd Barrett, who was in the year below him, and Roger Waters, who was in the year above him. Thorgerson and Waters played rugby together at school, while Thorgerson's mother Vanji and Waters' mother Mary were close friends. He studied English and Philosophy at the University of Leicester, graduating with a Bachelor of Arts degree with Honours, before studying Film and Television at the Royal College of Art, where he graduated with a Master of Arts degree.

He was a teenage friend of Pink Floyd guitarist David Gilmour and best man at Gilmour's wedding to Polly Samson in 1994.

Career
In 1968, along with Aubrey Powell, he founded the graphic art group Hipgnosis, and between them they designed many famous single and album covers, with Peter Christopherson joining them for their later commissions. In 1983, following the dissolution of Hipgnosis, Thorgerson and Powell formed Greenback Films, producing music videos.

In the early nineties, Thorgerson inaugurated StormStudios along with Peter Curzon—a loose group of freelancers. The line up included Rupert Truman (photographer), Finlay Cowan (designer and illustrator), Daniel Abbott (designer and artist), Lee Baker (creative retoucher and designer), and Jerry Sweet (designer) along with Thorgerson's personal assistants, Laura Truman (prints), and Charlotte Barnes.

Perhaps Thorgerson's most famous designs are those for Pink Floyd. His design for The Dark Side of the Moon has been called one of the greatest album covers of all time. Designed by Thorgerson and Hipgnosis, the artwork for the cover itself was drawn by George Hardie, a designer at NTA Studios. Many of Thorgerson's designs are notable for their surreal elements. He often places objects out of their traditional contexts, especially with vast spaces around them, to give them an awkward appearance while highlighting their beauty. To quote Thorgerson, "I like photography because it is a reality medium, unlike drawing which is unreal. I like to mess with reality ... to bend reality. Some of my works beg the question of is it real or not?"

Over the years, Thorgerson and his team designed and released several books about their work. The first, published in 1989, was titled Classic Album Covers of 60s. The Gathering Storm – A Quartet in Several Parts was the final book Thorgerson worked on with his team and it was completed just before his death in April 2013. The book was released in September 2013 and includes album covers artwork, photographs, and anecdotes, spanning five decades from his early work with Hipgnosis through to StormStudios.

In 2013, Prog Magazine renamed its Grand Design Award after Thorgerson.  It is now known as the Storm Thorgerson Grand Design Award and will be given to the designer of the year's best-packaged product. Thorgerson had won the 2012 award for his continued work with Pink Floyd.

In 2015 a film documentary, Taken By Storm, was released on DVD and web streaming.

Health problems and death 
In 2003, Thorgerson suffered a stroke, from which he was partially paralysed. He was later diagnosed with an undisclosed form of cancer which eventually led to his death in London on 18 April 2013, at the age of 69. After Thorgerson's death, David Gilmour released a statement describing him as "a constant force in my life, both at work and in private, a shoulder to cry on, and a great friend". A post on the official Pink Floyd website called him a "graphic genius". Pink Floyd drummer Nick Mason said that he was a "tireless worker right up to the end". He is buried on the eastern side of Highgate Cemetery.

Works

Album cover designs (1968–2014)
 

10cc
Sheet Music (1974)
The Original Soundtrack (1975)
How Dare You! (1976)
Deceptive Bends (1977)
Bloody Tourists (1978)
Greatest Hits 1972–1978 (1979)
Look Hear? (1980)
Windows in the Jungle (1983)
Mirror Mirror (1994)
Clever Clogs (2008)
Tenology (2012)
AC/DC
Dirty Deeds Done Dirt Cheap (1976) (international edition)
Airwaves
Next Stop (1979)
Alan Parsons
Try Anything Once (1993)
On Air (1996)
The Time Machine (1999)
A Valid Path (2004)
The Alan Parsons Project
Tales of Mystery and Imagination (1976)
I Robot (1977)
Pyramid (1978)
Eve (1979)
Eye in the Sky (1982)
Ammonia Avenue (1984)
The Almighty
Just Add Life (1996)
Al Stewart
Past, Present and Future (1973)
Modern Times (1975)
Year of the Cat (1976)
The Early Years (1977)
Time Passages (1978)
Amazulu
"Mony Mony" (single) (1987)
"Wonderful World, Beautiful People" (single) (1987)
The Amplifetes
Where Is the Light (2013)
Another Animal
Another Animal (2007)
The Answer
New Horizon (2013)
Anthrax
Stomp 442 (1995)
A.P. and the Heath
Bleak Future (EP) (2013)
Argent
Ring of Hands (1971)
In Deep (1973)
Ashra
Correlations (1979)
Audience
The House on the Hill (1971)
Lunch (1972)
You Can't Beat 'em (1973)
Audioslave
Audioslave (2002)
The Aynsley Dunbar Retaliation
The Aynsley Dunbar Retaliation (1968)
Doctor Dunbar's Prescription (1969)
To Mum, From Aynsley & the Boys (1969)
Remains to Be Heard (1970)
Bad Company
Bad Company (1974)
Straight Shooter (1975)
Burnin' Sky (1977)
Desolation Angels (1979)
Rough Diamonds (1982)
Barclay James Harvest
Welcome to the Show (1990)
Be-Bop Deluxe
Drastic Plastic (1978)
Biffy Clyro
Puzzle (2007)
"Saturday Superhouse" (2007)
"Living is a Problem Because Everything Dies" (2007)
"Folding Stars" (2007)
"Machines" (2007)
Only Revolutions (2009)
"That Golden Rule" (2009)
"The Captain" (2009)
"Lonely Revolutions" (2010)
Opposites (2013)
"Black Chandelier" (2013)
"Biblical" (2013)
"Opposite" (2013)
"Victory Over the Sun" (2013) 
"Similarities" (2014)
Black Sabbath
Technical Ecstasy (1976)
Never Say Die! (1978)
Blinker the Star
August Everywhere (1999)
Blue Mink
A Time of Change (1972)
Fruity (1974)
Brand XUnorthodox Behaviour (1976)Moroccan Roll (1977)Livestock (1977)Product (1979)Do They Hurt? (1980)
Bruce DickinsonSkunkworks (1996)
Bunk DoggerFirst Offence (1978)
Catherine Wheel
 Chrome (1993)
 Happy Days (1995)
 Like Cats and Dogs (compilation) (1996)
 Adam And Eve (1997)
 Wishville (2000)
CaravanCunning Stunts (1975)
Cozy PowellTilt (1981)
The CranberriesBury the Hatchet (1999)Beneath the Skin – Live in Paris DVD (2001)Wake Up and Smell the Coffee (2001)Stars: The Best of 1992–2002 (2002)
The CultElectric (1987) (credited on the picture sleeve as "Art Direction by Storm Thorgerson")
CochiseCochise (1970)
Danny WilsonBebop Moptop (1989)
David GilmourDavid Gilmour (1978)About Face (1984)David Gilmour in Concert DVD (2002)
De BlancDe Blanc (1983)
Def LeppardHigh 'n' Dry (1981)
Deepest BlueLate September (2004)
Disco BiscuitsPlanet Anthem (2010)
Dream TheaterFalling into Infinity (1997)
"Once in a LIVEtime" (1998)
"5 Years in a Livetime" (1998)
The DukesThe Dukes (1979)
Edgar Broughton BandEdgar Broughton Band (1971)Inside Out (1972)Oora (1973)A Bunch of 45s (1975)Parlez-Vous English (1979)
Electric Light OrchestraThe Electric Light Orchestra (1971)ELO 2 (1973)On the Third Day (1973)The Light Shines On (1977)
Ellis, Beggs, & HowardHomelands (1989)
EthnixYour Way (2001)13 (2002)
EuropeSecret Society (2006)
Fabulous PoodlesMirror Stars (1978)
FlashFlash (1972)Out of Our Hands (1973)
Foreigner4 (Labels only) (1981)
FoxBlue Hotel (1977)
Gary BrookerNo More Fear of Flying (1979)
Godley & CremeFreeze Frame (1979)
The GodsGenesis (1968)To Samuel a Son (1969)
GenesisThe Lamb Lies Down on Broadway (1974)A Trick of the Tail (1976)Wind & Wuthering (1976)...And Then There Were Three... (1978)
Gentlemen Without WeaponsTransmissions (1988)
The Greatest Show on EarthHorizons (1970)The Going's Easy (1970)The Greatest Show on Earth (1975)
Greg FriedmanCan't Talk Now (2013)
GunGun Sight (1969)
goodbyemotelIf (2014)
GooseSynrise (2012)
Healing SixesEnormosound (2002)
Heavy Metal KidsKitsch (1977)
HelloweenPink Bubbles Go Ape (1991)
Herman Rarebell Nip in the Bud (1981)
Humble PieTown and Country (1969)Thunderbox (1974)
Human Sexual ResponseFig. 14 (1980)
Ian Dury and The BlockheadsMr. Love Pants (1998)
John WettonCaught in the Crossfire (1980)
Jon AndersonOlias of Sunhillow (1976)
KansasIn the Spirit of Things (1988)
Katia and Marielle LabèqueGladrags (1983)
KennedyKreisler (1998) (Unused artwork)
Korda MarshallNow We Breathe (2015)
Led ZeppelinPresence (1976)The Song Remains the Same (1976)In Through the Out Door (1979)Coda (1982)
Leisure CruiseLeisure Cruise (2014)
Leo SayerLiving in a Fantasy (1980)
LifeLife After Death (1974)
London Posse"London Posse" (single) (1987)
MachineriMachineri (2012)
The Mars VoltaDe-Loused in the Comatorium (2003)
"Inertiatic ESP" single (2003)
"Televators" single (2003)Frances the Mute (2005)
"The Widow" single (2005)Amputechture (2006) (original artwork)
Marvin, Welch & FarrarMarvin, Welch & Farrar (1971)Second Opinion (1971)
MegadethRude Awakening DVD (2002)
Mick Taylor
Mick Taylor (1979)
Midnight Flyer
Midnight Flyer (1981)
Mike Oldfield
Earth Moving (1989)
Earth Moving single (1989)
Mike Rutherford
Smallcreep's Day (1980)
Moodswings
Psychedelicatessen (1997)
The Moody Blues
Caught Live + 5 (1977)
Muse
Absolution (2003)
"Hysteria" single (2003)
"Butterflies and Hurricanes" single (2004)
Black Holes and Revelations (2006)
"Uprising" single (2009)
Nazareth
Rampant (1974)
Hair of the Dog (1975)
Close Enough for Rock 'n' Roll (1976)
Neil Ardley
Harmony of the Spheres (1978)
The Nice
Five Bridges (1970)
Elegy (1971)
Autumn '67 – Spring '68 (1972)
Nick Mason
Fictitious Sports (1981)
O.A.R.
Stories of a Stranger (2005)
The Offspring
Splinter (2003)
Paul McCartney
Tug of War (1982)
Peter Gabriel
Peter Gabriel (1977) ("Car")
Peter Gabriel (1978) ("Scratch")
Peter Gabriel (1980) ("Melt")
Pendulum
Immersion (2010)
Phish
Slip Stitch and Pass (1997)
The Pineapple Thief
Someone Here Is Missing (2010)
Pink Floyd
A Saucerful of Secrets (1968)
More (1969)
Ummagumma (1969)
Atom Heart Mother (1970)
Meddle (1971)
Obscured by Clouds (1972)
The Dark Side of the Moon (1973)
A Nice Pair (1973)
Wish You Were Here (1975)
Animals (1977)
A Collection of Great Dance Songs (1981)
A Momentary Lapse of Reason (1987)
Delicate Sound of Thunder (1988)
Shine On (1992)
The Division Bell (1994)
P*U*L*S*E (1995), including the blinking LED light that was featured in early CD packaging.
Relics re-release (1996)
Is There Anybody Out There? The Wall Live 1980–81 (2000)
Echoes: The Best of Pink Floyd (2001)
Oh, by the Way (2007)
The Best of Pink Floyd: A Foot in the Door (2011)
The Plea
The Dreamers Stadium (2012)
The Police
"De Do Do Do, De Da Da Da" (single) (1980)
Powderfinger
Golden Rule (2009)
Pretty Things
Parachute (1970)
Freeway Madness (1972)
Silk Torpedo (1974)
Savage Eye (1976)
Cross Talk (1980)
Program the Dead
Program The Dead (2005)
Quatermass
Quatermass (1970)
Queen
Greatest Hits (1981) (Unused artwork)
"Las Palabras de Amor (The Words of Love)" (single) (1982)
Rainbow
Difficult to Cure (1981)
Straight Between the Eyes (1982)
Bent Out of Shape (1983)
Ragga and the Jack Magic Orchestra
Ragga and the Jack Magic Orchestra (1997)
Ralph McTell
Slide Away the Screen (1979)
Red Hot Chili Peppers
 Stadium Arcadium (2006) (unused)
Renaissance
Prologue (1972)
Ashes Are Burning (1973)
Turn of the Cards (1974)
Scheherazade and Other Stories (1975)
A Song for All Seasons (1978)
Rick Wakeman
1984 (1981)
Rick Wright
Wet Dream (1978)
Broken China (1996)
Rival Sons
Pressure & Time (2011)
Robert Plant
The Principle of Moments (1983)
"Big Log" (single) (1983)
Roger Chapman
"The Drum" (single) (1987)
Roger Taylor
Fun in Space (1981)
Roy Harper
Lifemask (1973)
Valentine (1974)
Flashes from the Archives of Oblivion (1974)
HQ (1975)
Bullinamingvase (1977)
Sammy Hagar
Sammy Hagar (1977)
Musical Chairs (1977)
Saxon
Destiny (1988)
Scorpions
Lovedrive (1979)
Animal Magnetism (1980)
Blackout (1982) (Unused artwork)
The Shadows
Rockin' with Curly Leads (1973)
Specs Appeal (1975)
Shpongle
Ineffable Mysteries from Shpongleland (2009)
Live in Concert at the Roundhouse London 2008 (2009)
Slow Earth
Latitude and 023 (2013)
Steve Hillage
Green (1978)
Live Herald (1979)
Steve Miller Band
Bingo! (2010)
Let Your Hair Down (2011)
Strawbs
Deadlines (1977)
Styx
Pieces of Eight (1978)
Cyclorama (2003)
Syd Barrett
The Madcap Laughs (1970)
Barrett (1970)
Syd Barrett (1974)
An Introduction to Syd Barrett (2010)
Toe Fat
Toe Fat (1970)
Toe Fat 2 (1971)
Tony Carey
Some Tough City (1984)
Thornley
Come Again (2004)
Tiny Pictures (2009)
Throbbing Gristle
20 Jazz Funk Greats (1979)
Heathen Earth (1980)
Thunder
Laughing on Judgement Day (1992)
Behind Closed Doors (1995)
T. Rex
Electric Warrior (1971)
Twink
Think Pink (1970)
UFO
Phenomenon (1974)
Force It (1975)
No Heavy Petting (1976)
Lights Out (1977)
Obsession (1978)
Strangers in the Night (1979)
No Place to Run (1980)
The Wild, the Willing and the Innocent (1981)
Making Contact (1983)
Headstone: The Best Of UFO (1983)
UK
Danger Money (1979)
Umphrey's McGee
Safety in Numbers (2006)
The Bottom Half (2007)
Uno
Uno (1974)
Villainy
Mode. Set. Clear. (2012)
Voyager
Halfway Hotel (1979)
Act of Love (1980)
Wax
American English (1987)
A Hundred Thousand in Fresh Notes (1989)
Ween
The Mollusk (1997)
Wishbone Ash
Pilgrimage (1971)
Argus (1972)
Wishbone Four (1973)
Live Dates (1973)
There's the Rub (1974)
New England (1976)
Classic Ash (1977)
Front Page News (1977)
No Smoke Without Fire (1978)
Just Testing (1980)
Live Dates 2 (1980)
Wings
Band on the Run (1973)
Venus and Mars (1975)
Wings at the Speed of Sound (1976)
Wings over America (1976)
London Town (1978)
Wings Greatest (1978)
Back to the Egg (1979)
The Wombats
This Modern Glitch (2011)
XTC
Go 2 (1978)
Yes
Going for the One (1977)
Tormato (1978)
Yumi Matsutoya
Sakuban Oaisimashō (1981)
Voyager (1983)
Train Of Thought (VHS film) (1984)
"Setsugekka" (single) (2003)
Younger Brother
Last Days of Gravity (2007)
Vaccine (2011)
Yourcodenameis:milo
Rapt. Dept. (2005)
17 (2005)
Ignoto (2005)

Music videos
 10cc – "The Power of Love" (1982)
 Paul Young – "Wherever I Lay My Hat (That's My Home)" (1983)
 Rainbow – "Street of Dreams" (1983)
 Robert Plant – "Big Log" (1983)
 Yes – "Owner of a Lonely Heart" (1983)
 Intaferon - "Get Out of London" (1983)
 Kevin Kitchen – "Tight Spot" (1984) 
 Nik Kershaw – "Wouldn't It Be Good" (1984)
 David Gilmour – "Blue Light" (1984)
 David Gilmour – "All Lovers Are Deranged" (1984)
 Nik Kershaw – "The Riddle" (1984)
 Nik Kershaw – "Wide Boy (1984)
 Nik Kershaw – "Don Quixote" (1985)
 Barry Gibb – "Now Voyager" (1985)
 Belouis Some – "Imagination" (1985)
 Belouis Some – "Some People" (1985)
 Glass Tiger – "Thin Red Line" (1985)
 Glass Tiger – "Someday" (1985)
 Ministry – "Over the Shoulder" (1985)
 The Cult – "Love Removal Machine" (1987)
 Pink Floyd – "Learning to Fly" (1987)
 Pink Floyd – "The Dogs of War" (1987)
 Wax – "Bridge to Your Heart" (1987)
 Wax – "American English" (1987)
 Wax – "In Some Other World" (1988)
 Anderson Bruford Wakeman Howe – "Brother of Mine" (1989)
 Bruce Dickinson – "Tattooed Millionaire" (1990)
 Bruce Dickinson – "All the Young Dudes" (1990)
 Helloween – "Kids of the Century" (1991)
 Alan Parsons – "Turn It Up" (1993)
 Pink Floyd – "High Hopes" (1994)
 Richard Wright – "Night Of a Thousand Furry Toys" (1996)

Books
 Thorgerson, S. and Dean, R. (eds), Album Cover Album. A&W Visual Library, New York & Dragon's World, Limpsfield, 1977. . Republished by Harper Design / Collins Design and Ilex Publishing, 2008. .
 Dean, R. and Howells, D. (compilers) and Thorgerson, S. (ed.), Album Cover Album, Volume 2. A&W Visual Library, New York & Dragon's World, Limpsfield, 1982. .
 Dean, R. and Thorgerson, S. (compilers), Album Cover Album, Volume 5. Dragon's World / Paper Tiger, Limpsfield, 1989. .
 Oliver, V., Thorgerson, S. and Dean, R. (compilers), Album Cover Album, Volume 6. Paper Tiger, Limpsfield, 1992. .
 Thorgerson, S. and Christopherson, P. (eds), "Hands Across The Water" - Wings Tour USA. Photographs by Hipgnosis. Dragon's World, Limpsfield and Reed Books, Los Angeles, 1978. .
 Thorgerson, S., compiled by Hipgnosis and George Hardie. The Work of Hipgnosis - "Walk Away René". Paper Tiger / Dragon's World, Limpsfield, 1978. .
 Thorgerson, S. et al., The Photo Designs of Hipgnosis: The Goodbye Look. Vermilion, London, 1982. .
 Thorgerson, S., Classic Album Covers of the 60s. Paper Tiger, London, 1989. .
 Thorgerson, S. and Powell, A., 100 Best Album Covers - The Stories Behind The Sleeves. Dorling Kindersley, London, 1999. .
 Mind Over Matter: The Images of Pink FLoyd:
 Thorgerson, S. and Curzon, P., 1st ed., Sanctuary Publishing, London, 1997. .
 Thorgerson, S. and Curzon, P., 2nd ed., Sanctuary Publishing, London, 2000. .
 Thorgerson, S. and Curzon, P., 3rd ed., Sanctuary Publishing, London, 2003. .
 Thorgerson, S. and Curzon, P., 4th ed., Omnibus Press, London, 2007. .
 Thorgerson, S., 5th ed., Omnibus Press, London, 2015. .
 Thorgerson, S., Curzon, P. and Crossland, J., Eye Of The Storm: The Album Graphics of Storm Thorgerson. Sanctuary, London, 1999. .
 Thorgerson, S. and Curzon, P., Taken By Storm: The Album Art of Storm Thorgerson: A Retrospective. Omnibus Press, London, 2007. .
 Thorgerson, S. and Powell, A., For The Love of Vinyl: The Album Art of Hipgnosis. PictureBox, New York, 2008. .
 Curzon, P. and Thorgerson, S., The Raging Storm - The Album Graphics of StormStudios. De Milo and StormStudios, 2011. .
 Truman, R. and Thorgerson, S., Riding Along in my Automobile: The American Cars of Cuba. De Milo and StormStudios, London, 2012. .
 Thorgerson, S., The Gathering Storm - A Quartet in Several Parts: The Album Art of Storm Thorgerson. De Milo and StormStudios, London, 2013. .
 Powell, A., Hipgnosis Portraits. Thames & Hudson, 2014. .
 Powell, A. (foreword by P. Gabriel), Vinyl. Album. Cover. Art - The Complete Hipgnosis Catalogue. Thames & Hudson, 2017. .

References

External links

Interview with "Floydian Slip" host Craig Bailey, September 1997
BBC Feature and audio interview
BBC Article on Thorgerson's work: Audio slideshow: Storm's sleeves
TateShots: Storm Thorgerson on Magritte The artist talks about the influence of Magritte on his work. 21 July 2011

 by Younger Brother (video, 8 mins, 2010)

Album-cover and concert-poster artists
Alumni of the Royal College of Art
Alumni of the University of Leicester
Burials at Highgate Cemetery
Deaths from cancer in England
English film directors
English graphic designers
English music video directors
English people of Norwegian descent
People educated at Summerhill School
People from Potters Bar
1944 births
2013 deaths